McDuffee or MacDuffee is a surname of Scottish and Irish origin, which is a variant of McDuffie or MacDuffie. The name is an Anglicization of the Gaelic Mac Duibhshíthe ("son of Duibhshíth"), which means "black peace". McDuffee may refer to:

Cyrus Colton MacDuffee (1895–1961), American mathematician
Willis McDuffee (1868–1934), American newspaper editor

See also
Latimer–MacDuffee theorem
McDuffie

References

Surnames of British Isles origin